Senator Moses may refer to:

Franklin J. Moses Sr. (1804–1877), South Carolina State Senate
George H. Moses (1869–1944), U.S. Senator from New Hampshire from 1918 to 1933
John Moses (American politician) (1885–1945), U.S. Senator from North Dakota in 1945